Juho Tapio Ilomäki (21 April 1904 − 25 July 1955) was a Finnish film composer. During his 25-year career, he composed music for several Finnish film production companies. Occasionally Ilomäki used a pseudonym Jussi Mäki.

Selected filmography 

 Laveata tietä (1931)
 False Greta (1934)
 Synnitön lankeemus (1943)
 Sellaisena kuin sinä minut halusit (1944)
 Noita palaa elämään (1952)
 Putkinotko (1954)

References

External links 
 

1904 births
1955 deaths
Finnish male composers
20th-century male musicians
20th-century Finnish composers